The following is the 1992–93 network television schedule for the four major English language commercial broadcast networks in the United States. The schedule covers primetime hours from September 1992 through August 1993. The schedule is followed by a list per network of returning series, new series, and series cancelled after the 1991–92 season. All times are Eastern and Pacific, with certain exceptions, such as Monday Night Football.

New series are highlighted in bold.

Each of the 30 highest-rated shows is listed with its rank and rating as determined by Nielsen Media Research.

 Yellow indicates the programs in the top 10 for the season.
 Cyan indicates the programs in the top 20 for the season.
 Magenta indicates the programs in the top 30 for the season.

PBS is not included; member stations have local flexibility over most of their schedules and broadcast times for network shows may vary.

Sunday

Monday

Tuesday 

Note: Fox added a Tuesday night lineup in January, giving it a schedule on all seven nights of the week for the first time.

Wednesday

Thursday

Friday

Saturday 

(*) Formerly known as The Torkelsons

By network

ABC 

Returning series
20/20
The ABC Sunday Night Movie
America's Funniest Home Videos
America's Funniest People
American Detective
Civil Wars
Coach
The Commish
Dinosaurs
Doogie Howser, M.D.
Family Matters
FBI: The Untold Stories
Full House
Home Improvement
Homefront
Jack's Place
Life Goes On
Matlock (moved from NBC)
Monday Night Football
Perfect Strangers
Primetime Live
Room for Two
Roseanne
Step by Step
The Wonder Years
The Young Indiana Jones Chronicles

New series
Camp Wilder
Covington Cross
Crossroads
Day One
Delta
Getting By *
Going to Extremes
Hangin' with Mr. Cooper
Home Free *
The Jackie Thomas Show *
Laurie Hill
Sirens *
Street Match *
Where I Live *
Wild Palms *

Not returning from 1991–92:
Anything But Love
Arresting Behavior
Baby Talk
Billy
Capitol Critters
Good & Evil
Growing Pains
Human Target
Julie
MacGyver
On the Air
Pros and Cons
Sibs
Who's the Boss?
The Young Riders

CBS

Returning series
48 Hours
60 Minutes
Bodies of Evidence
Brooklyn Bridge
CBS Sunday Movie
Designing Women
Evening Shade
In the Heat of the Night (moved from NBC)
Knots Landing
Major Dad
Murder, She Wrote
Murphy Brown
Northern Exposure
Raven
Rescue 911
Street Stories with Ed Bradley
Top Cops

New series
Angel Street
Big Wave Dave's *
Bob
The Boys *
The Building *
Cutters *
Dr. Quinn, Medicine Woman *
Dudley *
Family Dog *
Frannie's Turn
The Golden Palace
Good Advice *
The Hat Squad
Hearts Afire
How'd They Do That? *
Johnny Bago *
A League of Their Own *
Love & War
Middle Ages
Picket Fences
Space Rangers *
Tall Hopes
The Trouble with Larry
Walker, Texas Ranger *

Not returning from 1991–92:
2000 Malibu Road
The Boys of Twilight
The Carol Burnett Show
Davis Rules
Fish Police
Freshman Dorm
Grapevine
Hearts Are Wild
Howie
The Human Factor
Jake and the Fatman
P.S. I Luv U
Palace Guard
Princesses
The Royal Family
Scorch
Teech
Tequila and Bonetti
The Trials of Rosie O'Neill

Fox

Returning series
America's Most Wanted
Beverly Hills, 90210
Code 3
Comic Strip Live
COPS
Down the Shore
FOX Night at the Movies
Herman's Head
In Living Color
Melrose Place
Married... with Children
Parker Lewis Can't Lose
Roc
Sightings
The Simpsons

New series
Batman: The Animated Series (original aired in daytime)
The Ben Stiller Show
Class of '96 *
Danger Theatre *
The Edge
Flying Blind
The Front Page *
Great Scott!
The Heights
Key West *
Likely Suspects
Martin
Shaky Ground *
TriBeCa *
Woops!

Not returning from 1991–92:
Best of the Worst
Bill & Ted's Excellent Adventure
Charlie Hoover
Drexell's Class
Get a Life
Rachel Gunn, R.N.
Stand By Your Man
The Sunday Comics
Totally Hidden Video
The Ultimate Challenge
True Colors
Vinnie & Bobby

NBC

Returning series
Almost Home (formerly known as The Torkelsons)
Blossom
Cheers
Dateline NBC
A Different World
Empty Nest
The Fresh Prince of Bel-Air
I'll Fly Away
L.A. Law
Law & Order
NBC Sunday Night Movie
The NBC Monday Movie
Nurses
The Powers That Be
Quantum Leap
Reasonable Doubts
Seinfeld
Sisters
Unsolved Mysteries
Wings

New series
Black Tie Affair *
Crime & Punishment *
Final Appeal
Here and Now
Homicide: Life on the Street *
I Witness Video
Mad About You
Out All Night
Rhythm & Blues
The Round Table
Route 66 *
Secret Service
South Beach *
Super Bloopers and New Practical Jokes *
What Happened?

Not returning from 1991–92:
The Adventures of Mark & Brian
The Cosby Show
Dear John
Eerie, Indiana
Exposé
The Fifth Corner
Flesh 'n' Blood
The Golden Girls
Hot Country Nights
In the Heat of the Night (moved to CBS)
Man of the People
Mann & Machine
Matlock (moved to ABC)
Night Court
Nightmare Cafe
Pacific Station
Walter & Emily

Note: The * indicates that the program was introduced in midseason.

References

United States primetime network television schedules
United States Network Television Schedule, 1992-93
United States Network Television Schedule, 1992-93